Dunmore Town is a town in the Bahamas. It has a population of 1,762 (2010 census).

It is the only town at Harbour Island, which is located just east from North Eleuthera.

Dunmore Town is one of the few settlements in the Bahamas with a predominantly White population.

References

External links
 Official website (from archive.org)

Populated places in the Bahamas